

Incumbents
 President: Salvador Sánchez Cerén
 Vice President: Óscar Ortiz

Events

 The 2018 Salvadoran legislative election is held to elect all 84 members of the Legislative Assembly of El Salvador.

Deaths

References

 
2010s in El Salvador
Years of the 21st century in El Salvador